Nartkala is a town and the administrative center of Urvansky District of the Kabardino-Balkar Republic, Russia, located  northeast of Nalchik. Population:

History
It was founded in 1913 as the railway station of Dokshukino; town status was granted to it in 1955. It was renamed Nartkala in 1967; the current name mean the city of the Narts (ancestors of various peoples of the Caucasus).

Administrative and municipal status
Within the framework of administrative divisions, Nartkala serves as the administrative center of Urvansky District, to which it is directly subordinated. As a municipal division, the town of Nartkala is incorporated within Urvansky Municipal District as Nartkala Urban Settlement.

Demographics
Population:

Ethnic composition
As of the 2002 Census, the ethnic distribution of the population was:
Kabardins: 55.4%
Russians: 31.5%
Turks: 3.2%
Ossetians: 2.0%
Ukrainians: 1.7%
Koreans: 1.0%
Other ethnicities: 5.2%

References

Notes

Sources

Cities and towns in Kabardino-Balkaria